Java Open Single Sign On (JOSSO) is an open source Identity and Access Management (IAM) platform for rapid and standards-based Cloud-scale Single Sign-On, web services security, authentication and provisioning.

See also 

 Shibboleth (Internet2)
 CAS
 Digital certificates
 List of single sign-on implementations

External links 
 JOSSO Home Page

Federated identity